The Maish House is a historic building located in Des Moines, Iowa, United States. George H. Maish was involved with a coal company and bank in his native Pennsylvania before he and his family relocated to Des Moines in 1869. While here he was a partner with his brother-in-law in a drug firm, in  banking, and insurance. He had this house built in 1882. The two-story frame structure was built in the Italianate style with Eastlake details, especially on the inside. It includes a burglar alarm/servants' call box which is still operative. The exterior features a wrap around porch, a hip roof, metal cresting on the ridge, various gables that are filled in with glass, bracketed eaves, and three corbelled chimneys. The house was listed on the National Register of Historic Places in 1977.

References 

Houses completed in 1882
Italianate architecture in Iowa
Houses in Des Moines, Iowa
National Register of Historic Places in Des Moines, Iowa
Houses on the National Register of Historic Places in Iowa